Tony Hill (born 13 March 1952) is a New Zealand cricketer. He played in two first-class matches for Central Districts from 1975 to 1977.

See also
 List of Central Districts representative cricketers

References

External links
 

1952 births
Living people
New Zealand cricketers
Central Districts cricketers
Cricketers from Auckland